Sanamxai , Sanamxay or Muang Sanamxai  is a small river town on  the Xe Khong River in Attapeu Province, in southern Laos. It is the capital of Sanamxay District.  It is downriver from the provincial capital of Attapeu and is connected by Lao National Highway 18.

References

Populated places in Attapeu province